is the fourth studio album by Japanese band Mucc, released on September 1, 2004. The European version was released on September 12, 2005. The album reached number 19 on the Oricon chart.

Track listing

Note
 "Kuchiki no Tō" ends at 8:00, and is followed by 3 minutes and 27 seconds of silence.
 Re-recording of "Namonaki Yume" and "Monokuro no Keshiki" were featured on their 2017 self-cover album Koroshi no Shirabe II This is NOT Greatest Hits.

Covers 
"Akatsuki Yami" and "Oboreru Sakana" were covered by Sid and gibkiy gibkiy gibkiy respectively, on the 2017 Mucc tribute album Tribute Of Mucc -en-.

References

Mucc albums
2004 albums